Hardcore is a 1977 British comedy film directed by James Kenelm Clarke and starring Fiona Richmond, Anthony Steel, Victor Spinetti, Ronald Fraser and Graham Crowden. It depicts a highly fictionalised account of the life of Richmond, who was a leading pin-up in the 1970s. It was the first of two movies Anthony Steel made with Richmond.

In the US the film was known as Fiona.

Cast
 Fiona Richmond as Fiona
 Anthony Steel as Robert Charlton
 Victor Spinetti as Duncan
 Ronald Fraser as Marty Kenelm-Smedley
 John Clive as Willi
 Roland Curram as Edward
 Graham Crowden as Lord Yardarm
 Graham Stark as Inspector Flaubert
 Percy Herbert as Hubert
 Jeremy Child as Tenniel
 John Hamill as Daniel
 Harry H. Corbett as Art
 Donald Sumpter as Mark
 Arthur Howard as Vicar
 Joan Benham as Norma Blackhurst
 Linda Regan as Secretary
 Michael Feast as Photographer
 Neil Cunningham as Schoolmaster (Mr Foster)

References

1970s sex comedy films
1977 films
1970s English-language films
British sex comedy films
1977 comedy films
Films directed by James Kenelm Clarke
1970s British films